The 1984–85 Los Angeles Kings season, was the Kings' 18th season in the National Hockey League. Following a fifth-place finish the previous season under three different coaches, Pat Quinn was hired as the new head coach of the Kings. In his first season, he returned them to the playoffs after a three-year absence with a 23-point improvement in the standings.  But despite the goal scoring brilliance of Marcel Dionne and Bernie Nicholls, the Kings could not duplicate their Miracle on Manchester performance this time, losing to the Edmonton Oilers in three straight games in the Smythe Division semi-finals.

Offseason

Transactions
June 9, 1984 – Acquired Bob Janecyk, a first-round choice in the 1984 NHL Entry Draft (Craig Redmond), a third-round choice in the 1984 NHL Entry Draft (John English) and a fourth-round choice in the 1984 NHL Entry Draft (Tom Glavine) from Chicago for a first-round choice in the 1984 NHL Entry Draft and a fourth-round choice in the 1984 NHL Entry Draft.

NHL Draft

This draft would the first for Rogie Vachon as the team's general manager.  It would be memorable in Kings history for hits as well as misses.  On the down side, the team's first round selection, Craig Redmond, didn't amount to much, and they used their fourth round draft pick on Tom Glavine, who opted instead to play professional baseball with the Atlanta Braves.  But on the plus side, Vachon struck gold in the 9th round with the 171st pick overall by choosing future Hockey Hall of Fame member Luc Robitaille.

Regular season

Season standings

Schedule and results

|- align="center"
| 1 || 11 || Edmonton Oilers || 2-2  || Los Angeles || 0-0-1
|- align="center"
| 2 || 13 || Vancouver Canucks || 5-6 (OT) || Los Angeles || 0-1-1
|- align="center"
| 3 || 14 || St. Louis Blues || 2-5 || Los Angeles || 0-2-1
|- align="center"
| 4 || 16 || Washington Capitals || 3-5 || Washington || 0-3-1
|- align="center"
| 5 || 18 || Montreal Canadiens || 3-3 || Montreal || 0-3-2
|- align="center"
| 6 || 20 || New York Islanders || 3-8 || Uniondale || 0-4-2
|- align="center"
| 7 || 21 || Chicago Black Hawks || 2-5 || Chicago || 0-5-2
|- align="center"
| 8 || 26 || Edmonton Oilers || 2-8 || Edmonton || 0-6-2
|- align="center"
| 9 || 27 || Winnipeg Jets || 2-2 || Winnipeg || 0-6-3
|- align="center"
| 10 || 29 || Winnipeg Jets || 5-3 || Winnipeg || 1-6-3
|- align="center"
| 11 || 31 || Vancouver Canucks || 10-3 || Vancouver || 2-6-3
|-

|- align="center"
| 12 || 3 || Toronto Maple Leafs || 7-0 || Los Angeles || 3-6-3
|- align="center"
| 13 || 5 || Chicago Black Hawks || 2-3 || Los Angeles || 3-7-3
|- align="center"
| 14 || 9 || Buffalo Sabres || 3-2 || Los Angeles || 4-7-3
|- align="center"
| 15 || 11 || New York Rangers || 4-2 || New York || 5-7-3
|- align="center"
| 16 || 13 || Quebec Nordiques || 5-4 (OT) || Quebec City || 6-7-3
|- align="center"
| 17 || 14 || Toronto Maple Leafs || 4-3 || Toronto || 7-7-3
|- align="center"
| 18 || 17 || Pittsburgh Penguins || 5-3 || Los Angeles || 8-7-3
|- align="center"
| 19 || 19 || Calgary Flames || 5-4 || Los Angeles || 9-7-3
|- align="center"
| 20 || 21 || New Jersey Devils || 8-1 || Los Angeles || 10-7-3
|- align="center"
| 21 || 24 || Winnipeg Jets || 5-9 || Los Angeles || 10-8-3
|- align="center"
| 22 || 27 || Winnipeg Jets || 3-5 || Los Angeles || 10-9-3
|- align="center"
| 23 || 29 || Vancouver Canucks || 12-1 || Los Angeles || 11-9-3
|-

|- align="center"
| 24 || 1 || Vancouver Canucks || 6-3 || Los Angeles || 12-9-3
|- align="center"
| 25 || 4 || Minnesota North Stars || 2-2 || Minnesota || 12-9-4
|- align="center"
| 26 || 5 || Chicago Black Hawks || 5-5 || Chicago || 12-9-5
|- align="center"
| 27 || 8 || Montreal Canadiens || 7-9 || Montreal || 12-10-5
|- align="center"
| 28 || 10 || New York Rangers || 2-4 || New York || 12-11-5
|- align="center"
| 29 || 13 || Edmonton Oilers || 7-2 || Los Angeles || 13-11-5
|- align="center"
| 30 || 15 || Calgary Flames || 6-5 || Los Angeles || 14-11-5
|- align="center"
| 31 || 18 || Calgary Flames || 6-3 || Calgary || 15-11-5
|- align="center"
| 32 || 19 || Edmonton Oilers || 3-7 || Edmonton || 15-12-5
|- align="center"
| 33 || 22 || Winnipeg Jets || 2-6 || Winnipeg || 15-13-5
|- align="center"
| 34 || 23 || Winnipeg Jets || 4-4 || Winnipeg || 15-13-6
|- align="center"
| 35 || 26 || Vancouver Canucks || 3-3 || Vancouver || 15-13-7
|- align="center"
| 36 || 27 || Boston Bruins || 6-6 || Los Angeles || 15-13-8
|- align="center"
| 37 || 30 || Philadelphia Flyers || 2-3 || Los Angeles || 15-14-8
|-

|- align="center"
| 38 || 3 || Minnesota North Stars || 3-8 || Los Angeles || 15-15-8
|- align="center"
| 39 || 5 || Detroit Red Wings || 5-3 || Detroit || 16-15-8
|- align="center"
| 40 || 7 || Boston Bruins || 4-5 (OT) || Boston || 16-16-8
|- align="center"
| 41 || 9 || Calgary Flames || 4-4 || Calgary || 16-16-9
|- align="center"
| 42 || 12 || Winnipeg Jets || 6-4 || Los Angeles || 17-16-9
|- align="center"
| 43 || 13 || Winnipeg Jets || 5-6 || Los Angeles || 17-17-9
|- align="center"
| 44 || 16 || Toronto Maple Leafs || 3-4 || Los Angeles || 17-18-9
|- align="center"
| 45 || 19 || New York Islanders || 6-5 (OT) || Los Angeles || 18-18-9
|- align="center"
| 46 || 21 || Edmonton Oilers || 7-8 || Edmonton || 18-19-9
|- align="center"
| 47 || 23 || Philadelphia Flyers || 6-3 || Los Angeles || 19-19-9
|- align="center"
| 48 || 25 || St. Louis Blues || 3-6 || St. Louis || 19-20-9
|- align="center"
| 49 || 26 || St. Louis Blues || 7-3 || St. Louis || 20-20-9
|- align="center"
| 50 || 29 || New Jersey Devils || 6-3 || Los Angeles || 21-20-9
|- align="center"
| 51 || 31 || Hartford Whalers || 5-3 || Los Angeles || 22-20-9
|-

|- align="center"
| 52 || 2 || Montreal Canadiens || 1-5 || Los Angeles || 22-21-9
|- align="center"
| 53 || 5 || New York Rangers || 7-5 || Los Angeles || 23-21-9
|- align="center"
| 54 || 7 || Philadelphia Flyers || 4-4 || Philadelphia || 23-21-10
|- align="center"
| 55 || 8 || Washington Capitals || 1-6 || Washington || 23-22-10
|- align="center"
| 56 || 10 || Pittsburgh Penguins || 4-3 || Pittsburgh || 24-22-10
|- align="center"
| 57 || 14 || Boston Bruins || 3-3 || Los Angeles || 24-22-11
|- align="center"
| 58 || 16 || Washington Capitals || 5-2 || Los Angeles || 25-22-11
|- align="center"
| 59 || 19 || Quebec Nordiques || 6-7 || Quebec City || 25-23-11
|- align="center"
| 60 || 21 || New Jersey Devils || 5-3 || New Jersey || 26-23-11
|- align="center"
| 61 || 23 || Hartford Whalers || 2-1 (OT) || Hartford || 27-23-11
|- align="center"
| 62 || 24 || Buffalo Sabres || 4-2 || Buffalo || 28-23-11
|- align="center"
| 63 || 27 || Quebec Nordiques || 2-5 || Los Angeles || 28-24-11
|-

|- align="center"
| 64 || 1 || Edmonton Oilers || 5-4 || Edmonton || 29-24-11
|- align="center"
| 65 || 3 || Calgary Flames || 0-7 || Calgary || 29-25-11
|- align="center"
| 66 || 5 || Pittsburgh Penguins || 6-0 || Los Angeles || 30-25-11
|- align="center"
| 67 || 8 || Vancouver Canucks || 3-4 || Vancouver || 30-26-11
|- align="center"
| 68 || 10 || Buffalo Sabres || 4-4 || Los Angeles || 30-26-12
|- align="center"
| 69 || 13 || Hartford Whalers || 3-3 || Los Angeles || 30-26-13
|- align="center"
| 70 || 16 || Detroit Red Wings || 8-3 || Los Angeles || 31-26-13
|- align="center"
| 71 || 17 || Edmonton Oilers || 5-4 || Los Angeles || 32-26-13
|- align="center"
| 72 || 19 || New York Islanders || 2-3 || Uniondale || 32-27-13
|- align="center"
| 73 || 20 || Detroit Red Wings || 6-8 || Detroit || 32-28-13
|- align="center"
| 74 || 23 || Calgary Flames || 3-4 || Los Angeles || 32-29-13
|- align="center"
| 75 || 27 || Calgary Flames || 2-4 || Los Angeles || 32-30-13
|- align="center"
| 76 || 29 || Calgary Flames || 0-3 || Calgary || 32-31-13
|- align="center"
| 77 || 30 || Minnesota North Stars || 3-2 || Los Angeles || 33-31-13
|-

|- align="center"
| 78 || 2 || Edmonton Oilers || 4-6 || Los Angeles || 33-32-13
|- align="center"
| 79 || 5 || Vancouver Canucks || 4-3 || Vancouver || 34-32-13
|- align="center"
| 80 || 6 || Vancouver Canucks || 4-4 || Los Angeles || 34-32-14
|-

Playoffs

1985 Smythe Division Semi-finals
Edmonton Oilers vs. Los Angeles Kings

Edmonton wins best-of-five series 3-0.

Player statistics

Awards and records

Records

Individual
Most goals in a game, 4 (tied with many others): Bernie Nicholls, November 13, 1984, at Quebec

Team
Most 30+ goal scorers in one season, 5: Marcel Dionne, Bernie Nicholls, Dave Taylor, Brian MacLellan, and Jim Fox
Most 40+ goal scorers in one season, 3 (tied with 1980-81 Kings): Marcel Dionne (46), Bernie Nicholls (46), and Dave Taylor (41)
Greatest margin of victory at home: 11: November 29, 1984, vs. Vancouver, 12-1
Greatest margin of victory on the road: 7: October 21, 1984, at Vancouver, 10-3

Transactions
The Kings were involved in the following transactions during the 1984–85 season.

Trades

Free agent signings

Free agents lost

Draft picks

References
 Kings on Hockey Database

Los Angeles Kings seasons
Los Angeles Kings
Los Angeles Kings
Los Angeles
Los Angeles